The Taiwan–Hong Kong Economic and Cultural Co-operation Council (THEC) represents the Government of Taiwan in talks with Hong Kong, through its counterpart the Hong Kong–Taiwan Economic and Cultural Co-operation and Promotion Council (ECCPC).

The THEC was set up in May 2010 in a symbiotic relationship with the Hong Kong ECCPC, similar to that between bodies representing Taiwan and mainland China in cross-strait talks, under a slightly hands-off approach that is often known as the "white glove" policy. The two councils, both with participation by high-ranking ministers, are incorporated as legal entities but will be authorised by the two governments to sign pacts.

The two bodies were established against a background of strengthened Hong Kong-Taiwan links and trade, which match improved China-Taiwan relations.

The THEC has two major committees, one on cultural and one on economic co-operation. This reflects Taiwan's broadbrush approach to its relationship with Hong Kong, and contrasts with the narrower business focus of the Hong Kong side.

Chairpersons
 Lin Chen-kuo (May 2010 – 15 April 2013)
 Johnnason Liu (16 April 2013 – August 2014)
 Lin Chu-chia (August 2014 –)

Transportation
The council is accessible within walking distance South West of Shandao Temple Station of the Taipei Metro.

See also

 Political status of Taiwan
 Hong Kong–Taiwan Economic and Cultural Co-operation and Promotion Council
 Economic Cooperation Framework Agreement
 Republic of China diplomatic missions
 Diplomatic missions in Hong Kong
 Hong Kong Economic, Trade and Cultural Office

References

External links
Taiwan–Hong Kong Economic and Cultural Co-operation Council

2010 establishments in Taiwan
Politics of Hong Kong
Politics of Taiwan
Organizations established in 2010
Hong Kong–Taiwan relations